Sultan Muhammad V (born 6 October 1969) has reigned as the 29th Sultan of Kelantan and the 12th Sultan of Modern Kelantan since September 2010 and served as the 15th Yang di-Pertuan Agong of Malaysia from December 2016 until his abdication in January 2019. He was proclaimed Sultan of Kelantan on 13 September 2010, succeeding his father, Sultan Ismail Petra, who was deemed incapacitated by illness. Sultan Muhammad V was proclaimed Yang di-Pertuan Agong on 13 December 2016. He became the first Yang di-Pertuan Agong to abdicate from the federal throne, effective 6 January 2019.

Early life and regency
Born Tengku Muhammad Faris Petra ibni Tengku Ismail Petra in Kota Bharu, Kelantan. He is the eldest son of Sultan Ismail Petra and Raja Perempuan Tengku Anis.

Tengku Faris received his early education at Fatima Convent
kindergarten from 1974 to 1975. He continued his primary education at SK Sultan Ismail (1), Kota Bharu from 1976 to 1981 and his secondary education at Alice Smith School, Kuala Lumpur before leaving for the United Kingdom to study at Oakham School, Rutland, England from 1983 to 1989. He then furthered his education at St Cross College, Oxford and at the Oxford Centre for Islamic Studies to study diplomatic studies, graduating in 1991. He also studied at Huron University College, London, Ontario, Canada; Deutsche Stiftung für Internationale Entwicklung (DSE), Berlin, Germany; and the European Business School, London, United Kingdom.

He was made the Tengku Mahkota (Crown Prince) of Kelantan on 30 March 1979 and formally installed at Balairong Sri, Istana Balai Besar, Kota Bharu, Kelantan on 6 October 1985.

On 14 May 2009, his father, Sultan Ismail Petra, suffered a major stroke. Sultan Ismail Petra was admitted to Mount Elizabeth Hospital in Singapore and Tengku Faris was appointed Regent on 25 May in the Sultan's absence.

Reign

Accession

On 13 September 2010, Tengku Muhammad Faris Petra was proclaimed the 29th Sultan of Kelantan, in accordance with Article 29A of the State Constitution which states that a Sultan can no longer be king if he is not viable to rule for a period of more than a year. He took the regnal name Sultan Muhammad V. 

Sultan Muhammad V attended the 222nd Meeting of the Conference of Rulers for the first time as a full member in October 2010. This marked the recognition of his accession as Sultan by other rulers.

Sultan Muhammad V is the Royal Artillery Regiment current Colonel-in-Chief, and also of the Kor Risik DiRaja (Royal Intelligence Corps), both of the Malaysian Army, as all his predecessors have been.

As per his duties as Sultan and head of the state of Kelantan, he serves currently as the Chancellor of Universiti Malaysia Kelantan (UMK), and was proclaimed on 23 November 2022.

Deputy Yang di-Pertuan Agong

Sultan Muhammad V was elected Deputy Yang di-Pertuan Agong in October 2011. He served in that post from 13 December 2011 until his election as Yang di-Pertuan Agong on 13 December 2016.

Yang di-Pertuan Agong

Sultan Muhammad V was elected by the Conference of Rulers on 14 October 2016 to become the next Yang di-Pertuan Agong, the head of state of Malaysia. His reign began on 13 December 2016, taking over from Abdul Halim, the Sultan of Kedah. Sultan Muhammad V was installed as the fifteenth Yang Di Pertuan Agong of Malaysia on 24 April 2017 in a ceremony held at the Istana Negara, Jalan Duta, Kuala Lumpur. At 47, Sultan Muhammad V was the fourth youngest Yang di-Pertuan Agong to be elected, after Tuanku Syed Putra of Perlis, Tuanku Mizan Zainal Abidin of Terengganu and Tuanku Abdul Halim of Kedah.

His younger brother, Tengku Muhammad Faiz Petra, the Tengku Mahkota, served as Regent of Kelantan throughout Sultan Muhammad V's tenure as Yang di-Pertuan Agong.

He was made an Honorary Fellow of his former College, St Cross College, Oxford on 28 February 2018.

In an unprecedented move, Sultan Muhammad V became the first Yang di-Pertuan Agong to abdicate from the throne, effective 6 January 2019 while his term was to end on 12 December 2021. This followed a leave of absence from his position following rumours that he had married a former Russian beauty queen.

Personal life
On 15 November 2004, Sultan Muhammad V (the then Tengku Mahkota) married Tengku Zubaidah binti Tengku Norudin bin Tengku Muda (née Kangsadal Pipitpakdee), a member of the Pattani royal family. He divorced her in 2008, which resulted in her losing the privilege as Tengku Ampuan Mahkota of Kelantan.

He was the first Yang di-Pertuan Agong in Malaysian history to reign without a Raja Permaisuri Agong consort.

On 30 October 2010, he married Che Puan Nur Diana Petra Abdullah (née Yana Yakoubka) and proclaimed her as the Sultanah of Kelantan on 2 August 2022, with the style Her Highness Sultanah Nur Diana Petra Abdullah.

In late November 2018, it was reported that while on leave from the country, Sultan Muhammad V had married former beauty pageant winner Oksana Voevodina in Barvikha, Russia. However, the reported marriage in Moscow was in fact a party to enable Oksana Voevodina's friends and family to celebrate the couple's official Islamic wedding, which had taken place in private on the 7 June 2018, in Kota Bharu, Kelantan, Malaysia, following Oksana's conversion to Islam in April 2018. There is no official record of a marriage in Russia. Voevodina won the Miss Moscow title in 2015. Media reported the birth of their son Tengku Ismail Leon Petra ibni Sultan Muhammad V on 21 May 2019. On 1 July 2019, Sultan Muhammad V divorced her by a "talak tiga" or talaq baayin that is the irrevocable divorce and most severe divorce in Islam, after filing of documents at the Singapore Syariah Court earlier on 22 June. On 6 September he acknowledged that the marriage did take place.

Titles and styles

Sultan Muhammad V's full style and title is in Malay:  Sultan Muhammad V, D.K., D.K.M., D.M.N., D.K. (Selangor), D.K. (Negeri Sembilan), D.K. (Johor), D.K. (Perak), D.K. (Perlis), D.K. (Kedah), D.K. (Terengganu), S.P.M.K., S.J.M.K., S.P.K.K., S.P.S.K., S.P.J.K., Al-Sultan Kelantan

in English: His Royal Highness Sultan Muhammad V, D.K., D.K.M., D.M.N., D.K. (Selangor), D.K. (Negeri Sembilan), D.K. (Johor), D.K. (Perak), D.K. (Perlis), D.K. (Kedah), D.K. (Terengganu), S.P.M.K., S.J.M.K., S.P.K.K., S.P.S.K., S.P.J.K., Al-Sultan of Kelantan

Awards and recognitions

Honours

He has been awarded:

Kelantan 
As Sultan of Kelantan (since 13 September 2010): 
  Recipient (DK, 6 October 1986) and Grand Master of the Royal Family Order (Al-Yunusi Star)
  Knight Grand Commander (SPMK) and Grand Master (since 13 September 2010) of the Order of the Crown of Kelantan (Al-Muhammadi Star)
  Knight Grand Commander (SJMK) and Grand Master (since 13 September 2010) of the Order of the Life of the Crown of Kelantan (Al-Ismaili Star) 
  Knight Grand Commander (SPSK) and Grand Master (since 13 September 2010) of the Order of the Loyalty to the Crown of Kelantan (Al-Ibrahimi Star)
  Knight Grand Commander (SPKK) and Grand Master (since 13 September 2010) of the Order of the Noble Crown of Kelantan (Al-Yahyawi Star)
  Grand Master of the Order of the Most Distinguished and Most Valiant Warrior (PYGP, since 13 September 2010)
  Founding Knight Grand Commander (SPJK) and Grand Master (since 11 November 2016) of the Most Loyal Order of Services to the Crown of Kelantan (Al-Petrawi Star)
  Silver Jubilee Medal (PJP, 30 March 2004)

Malaysia and its other states 
  : 
  Grand Master of the Order of the Royal Family of Malaysia (13 December 2016 – 6 January 2019) and Recipient (DKM, 31 January 2017)
  Recipient (DMN, 7 December 2011) and Grand Master of the Order of the Crown of the Realm (13 December 2016 – 6 January 2019) 
  Grand Master of the Order of the Defender of the Realm (13 December 2016 – 6 January 2019) 
  Grand Master of the Order of Loyalty to the Crown of Malaysia (13 December 2016 – 6 January 2019) 
  Grand Master of the Order of Merit of Malaysia (13 December 2016 – 6 January 2019) 
  Grand Master of the Order of Meritorious Service (13 December 2016 – 6 January 2019) 
  Grand Master of the Order of Loyalty to the Royal Family of Malaysia (13 December 2016 – 6 January 2019)
  : 
  First Class of the Royal Family Order of Johor (DK I, 14 April 2011)
   :
  Member of the Royal Family Order of Kedah (DK, 26 March 2012)
  : 
  Member of the Royal Family Order of Negeri Sembilan (DKNS, 13 January 2011)
  : 
  Recipient of the Royal Family Order of Perak (DK, 24 July 2011)
  : 
  Recipient of the Perlis Family Order of the Gallant Prince Syed Putra Jamalullail (DK, 19 October 2011)
  : 
  First Class of the Royal Family Order of Selangor (DK I, 5 January 2011)
   :
  Member first class of the Family Order of Terengganu (DK I, 9 November 2014)

Foreign
  : 
  Member Special Class of the Order of Sheikh Isa bin Salman Al Khalifa (1 May 2017)
  : 
  Sultan of Brunei Golden Jubilee Medal (5 October 2017)
  :
  Grand Cross of the Order of the Legion of Honour (27 March 2017)
  :
  Collar of the Order of Independence (15 October 2017)
  : 
  Collar of Badr Chain (26 February 2017)

Academic

 Honorary Fellow, St Cross College, University of Oxford (28 February 2018)

Places named after him

Several places were named after him, including:
 Sultan Muhammad V Mosque in Kampung Lajau, Labuan
 Sultan Muhammad V Mosque in Kompleks Penjara Sungai Udang, Melaka
 Wisma Sultan Muhammad V in Cairo, Egypt
 Tengku Muhammad Faris Petra Mosque in Kuala Krai, Kelantan
 Tengku Muhammad Faris Petra Science Secondary School in Pengkalan Chepa, Kelantan

Trivia
 He has the shortest regnal name of all the Yang di-Pertuan Agong.
 He is the first Yang di-Pertuan Agong to reign without a Raja Permaisuri Agong consort.
 He is the first Yang di-Pertuan Agong to abdicate from the throne, effective 6 January 2019 while his term was to end on 12 December 2021.

Ancestry

References

|-

Monarchs of Malaysia
Muhammad 05
1969 births
Living people
Alumni of St Cross College, Oxford
First Classes of the Royal Family Order of Johor
Malaysian people of Malay descent
Monarchs who abdicated
People from Kelantan
People from Kota Bharu
First Classes of Royal Family Order of Selangor
Royal House of Kelantan
21st-century Malaysian politicians
Alumni of European Business School London
Grand Croix of the Légion d'honneur
Recipients of the Order of the Crown of the Realm